Osvaldo Bignami (Lodi, 1856 – Civate (Lecco), 1936) was an Italian painter.

Biography
Osvaldo Bignami was apprenticed to a decorative artist in Milan, where he moved when he was in his twenties, and later enrolled at the Brera Academy. From his earliest work, he was oriented towards fresco decoration: this was the technique he used in the portraits of Masaccio and Giovanni Bellini (originally on the loggias of the Brera Palazzo in Milan and now lost) which won him the Mylius Prize in 1893 and 1894. He was a regular participant in the Brera exhibitions until 1900. His most noteworthy paintings were those with religious subjects, genre scenes and the portraits of Luigi Sabatelli, Giacomo Mantegazza and Enrico Zanoni (formerly in Milan, Società Artisti e Patriottica). In later years he devoted himself to the decorative painting of civic buildings, such as Teatro Fraschini in Pavia (1909), and religious buildings, such as some of the chapels at the Monumental Cemetery in Lodi (1902–1914) and the church of Santa Maria del Carmine in Milan (1904, 1909). He also experimented with lithography.

References
 Laura Casone, Osvaldo Bignami, online catalogue Artgate by Fondazione Cariplo, 2010, CC BY-SA (source for the first revision of this article).

Other projects

19th-century Italian painters
Italian male painters
20th-century Italian painters
Painters from Milan
Brera Academy alumni
1856 births
1936 deaths
19th-century Italian male artists
20th-century Italian male artists